The F and <F> Queens Boulevard Express/Sixth Avenue Local are two rapid transit services in the B Division of the New York City Subway. Their route bullets are colored , since they use and are part of the IND Sixth Avenue Line in Manhattan.

The F operates at all times between 179th Street in Jamaica, Queens and Stillwell Avenue in Coney Island, Brooklyn, making all stops except for an express section in Queens between Forest Hills–71st Avenue and 21st Street–Queensbridge. During late nights, the F makes all stops in Queens as well. Two scheduled rush hour trips in the peak direction run express in Brooklyn between Jay Street–MetroTech and Church Avenue, making one stop in between at Seventh Avenue. This express service was introduced in September 2019. In Brooklyn, local service is denoted as (F) in a circle-shaped bullet while express service is denoted as <F> in a diamond-shaped bullet.

From 1968 to 1976, the F ran express along the IND Culver Line in Brooklyn. The F also ran via the 53rd Street Tunnel until moving to the 63rd Street Tunnel in 2001. Since the 1990s, there have been calls to restore partial express service from Jay Street–MetroTech to Church Avenue, although this has been very controversial. The limited express <F> service between Jay Street and Church Avenue started on September 16, 2019, with two trains in the peak direction during rush hours.

History

1940s and 1950s 

With the opening of the IND Sixth Avenue Line on December 15, 1940, F service began, operating as the line's Queens Boulevard service. It operated between Parsons Boulevard and Church Avenue via Queens Boulevard Line, Sixth Avenue Line, and the Culver Line. It ran express in Queens and local in Manhattan and Brooklyn. F trains provided an additional 24/7 express route in Queens, and inaugurated express service on the Queens Boulevard Line east of Continental Avenue. F trains ran on the express tracks between West Fourth Street and Broadway-Lafayette Street to avoid conflict with the D and E south of West Fourth Street. This service pattern was first announced by the New York City Board of Transportation on December 1, 1939. With the start of F service, E service was cut back from Church Avenue to Broadway–Lafayette Street.

On January 10, 1944, trains were extended to 169th Street during evenings, late nights, and Sunday mornings.

On December 11, 1950, trains were extended to the newly opened Jamaica–179th Street on evenings, nights, and Sunday mornings. On May 13, 1951, all trains outside of rush hour were extended to 179th Street using the local tracks beyond Parsons Boulevard. On October 8, 1951, trains were extended to 179th Street at all times. During rush hours F trains skipped 169th Street running via the express tracks. At other times, the F stopped at 169th Street. 

The E and F began running eleven-car trains during rush hours on September 8, 1953. The extra train car increased the total carrying capacity by 4,000 passengers. The lengthening project cost $400,000. The operation of eleven-car trains ended in 1958 because of operational difficulties. The signal blocks, especially in Manhattan, were too short to accommodate the longer trains, and the motormen had a very small margin of error to properly platform the train. It was found that operating ten-car trains allowed for two additional trains per hour to be scheduled.

On October 30, 1954, the connection between the IND Culver Line and BMT Culver Line opened, with the IND taking over the elevated section. All F service began terminating at Broadway–Lafayette Street with  service entering Brooklyn via the Rutgers Street Tunnel. In addition, weekend and night trains began running local between Continental Avenue and 179th Street. During middays and early evenings, trains stopped at 169th Street. On April 29, 1956, trains were extended to Second Avenue.

Beginning on October 6, 1957, trains began terminating at 34th Street–Herald Square during nights and weekends. Between September 8 and November 7, 1958, two F trains ran between Forest Hills and Second Avenue, leaving Forest Hills at 8:06 and 8:21 a.m. On November 10, they were routed to Hudson Terminal, before returning to Queens in E service. On the same day, F service was cut back from Second Avenue and started terminating at Broadway–Lafayette Street to allow for construction on the Chrystie Street Connection.

1960s through 1980s 
Two additional F trains began running from Parsons Boulevard during the morning rush hour on April 6, 1964; these trips began entering service at 179th Street on December 21, 1964. On December 13, 1965, two morning F trains began running to Chambers Street. Beginning on July 11, 1966, trains no longer ran express between Parsons Boulevard and 71st–Continental Avenues weekday middays, and were extended weekdays daytime from Broadway-Lafayette Street back to Second Avenue. On August 30, 1966, service was cut back to Broadway-Lafayette Street. 

With the opening of the Chrystie Street Connection on November 26, 1967,  service was rerouted via this connection, the north side of the Manhattan Bridge, and the BMT Brighton Line in Brooklyn. F service replaced it on the IND Culver Line, with trips running to Coney Island at all times, with supplemental trips to Church Avenue during rush hours.

Beginning on August 19, 1968, rush hour express service was added, in both directions, between Jay Street-Borough Hall and Church Avenue, and in rush hours, peak direction trains to and from Stillwell Avenue (alternating with those terminating at Kings Highway) ran express as well between Church Avenue and Kings Highway. Beginning on June 16, 1969 express service was modified, with Kings Highway trains operating as locals along the entire route from Jay Street to Kings Highway. 

On January 2, 1973, Kings Highway F trains began running express once again between Church Avenue and Jay Street in both directions. In addition, F trains began running express between 179th Street and Continental Avenue weekdays between 7:30 a.m. and 7:30 p.m. toward Queens, and between 6:00 a.m. and 6:15 p.m. toward Manhattan. In addition, between 10:00 a.m. and 2:20 p.m. Manhattan-bound, and between 10:00 a.m. and 3:00 p.m. Queens-bound, F trains would stop at 169th Street.

On January 18, 1976, F express service between Jay Street and Church Avenue was discontinued during rush hours in the peak direction, and only Coney Island trains in the reverse-peak direction ran express between Jay Street and Church Avenue. Peak direction GG trains were cut back to Smith–Ninth Streets. On August 30, 1976, express service between Bergen Street and Church Avenue was completely discontinued, with all trains making all stops. Rush direction alternate-train express service between Ditmas Avenue and Kings Highway was retained. In addition, several northbound trips in the morning rush hour began being put into service at Avenue X. GG trains began terminating at Smith–9th Streets at all times. The elimination of express service was made as part of service changes which eliminated 215 runs that were deemed underutilized to reduce operating deficits. The changes, which saved $3.1 million annually, were part of a three phase cut in service that began in 1975. This change was also made due to continuing complaints about reduced Manhattan service by riders at local stations.

On January 24, 1977, as part of a series of NYCTA service cuts to save $13 million, many subway lines began running shorter trains during middays. As part of the change, F trains began running with four cars between 9:50 a.m. and 1:50 p.m. This change was made as part of the last round of cuts in subway service announced in January 1977 to reduce annual operating costs by $30 million. Changes were also made in A, AA, B and N service. The NYCTA said that the cuts only duplicated other night service, and for most, would increase travel by a few minutes.

Until 1986, 2 E trains and 2 F trains started at Continental Avenue in the morning rush hour with the intention to relieve congestion. These trains were eliminated because they resulted in a loading imbalance as these lightly-loaded trains would be followed by extremely crowded trains from 179th Street, which followed an 8-minute gap of E and F service from 179th Street.

On May 24, 1987,  and  services swapped terminals in Queens to provide R trains direct access to the Jamaica Yard. As part of the reroute plan, F service along Queens Boulevard was discontinued during late nights (1 a.m. to 5 a.m.). Late night local service was replaced by the R, which ran as a Queens Boulevard Local at all times. F trains were cut back to 57th Street on the Sixth Avenue Line during late nights. In 1986, the TA studied which two services should serve the line during late nights as ridership at this time did not justify three services. A public hearing was held in December 1986, and it was determined that having the E and R run during late nights provided the best service.

Peak-direction F express service on the Culver Line in Brooklyn, between Kings Highway and 18th Avenue, was suspended on April 27, 1987 because of work to reconstruct station mezzanines along that part of the Culver Line, and was never restored in this section.

Archer and 63rd Street changes 
On December 11, 1988, the Archer Avenue Lines opened, and the E was rerouted to its current terminus at Jamaica Center, running via the Queens Boulevard Line's express tracks. It was decided that the E would serve Archer Avenue, rather than the F, to minimize disruption to passengers who continued to use Hillside Avenue; to maximize Jamaica Avenue ridership; and to take advantage of the length of the peak ridership period, which is longer on the F. It was found that most riders using bus routes that now served Archer Avenue used the E, while most passengers on buses to 179th Street used the F. F trains no longer stopped at 169th Street between 10 a.m. and 3:30 p.m., so the R was extended to 179th Street to serve local stations east of Continental Avenue and to allow F trains to continue running express to 179th Street.

The 1988 changes angered some riders because they resulted in the loss of direct Queens Boulevard Express service at local stations east of 71st Avenue—namely the 169th Street, Sutphin Boulevard, Van Wyck Boulevard and 75th Avenue stations. Local elected officials pressured the MTA to eliminate all-local service at these stations. On September 30, 1990, the R was cut back to 71st–Continental Avenue outside of rush hours. Late night service to 179th Street was replaced by G service, while F trains began running local east of 71st Avenue during middays, evenings, and weekends. In response to the pleas of local officials, the MTA considered three options including leaving service as is, having E trains run local east of 71st Avenue along with R service, and having F trains run local east of 71st Avenue to replace R service. The third option was chosen for testing in October or November 1992.

On October 26, 1992, R trains were cut back to 71st Avenue at all times. In its place, the F ran local between 71st Avenue and 179th Street at all times, which eliminated express service along Hillside Avenue. This change was implemented for six months on an experimental basis at the request of passengers using the 169th Street, Sutphin Boulevard, Van Wyck Boulevard and 75th Avenue stations, which had lost direct Queens Boulevard Express service in 1988. After the six months, the change was kept even though 77% of passengers had benefitted from the pre-October 1992 service plan because there was minimal negative passenger reaction and the intensity of the request. The change increased travel time along the F by  minutes, and reduced travel time for passengers at local stations by one to two minutes.

On October 29, 1989, the IND 63rd Street Line opened. Since Q trains did not run during late nights, a special daily late night F– service ran during these hours; in the northbound direction, F trains would operate along its normal route from Coney Island to 47th–50th Streets–Rockefeller Center, then turn into a Q and operate to 21st Street–Queensbridge; in the southbound direction, Q trains would operate from 21st Street to 47th–50th Streets, then turn into an F train and operate along its normal route to Coney Island. The special F/Q service was eventually designated as F in April 1993.

In March 1997, late night service was cut back to 57th Street due to work to reconstruct the trackbed in the 63rd Street Tunnel. A single-track shuttle provided service between 57th Street and 21st Street.

On August 30, 1997, late night F service was restored to 179th Street as a Queens Boulevard local, replacing G service, which was cut back to Court Square. Service on the 63rd Street Line was provided by a shuttle. On that date, E service began running local in Queens during late nights. These changes were made to accommodate construction work for the 63rd Street Connection.

On May 7, 2001, the F service started being rerouted via the new 63rd Street connector during some nights and weekends. On December 16, 2001, the 63rd Street Connector officially opened, connecting the IND 63rd Street Line with the IND Queens Boulevard Line. In a controversial move, the new local  service replaced the express F service in the heavily trafficked 53rd Street Tunnel between Manhattan and Queens, while F service was rerouted to the 63rd Street Tunnel and ran express in Queens between 71st Avenue and 21st Street–Queensbridge at all times. As part of the change, rush hour service was decreased from 18 trains per hour to 15 trains per hour, allowing E service to increase from 12 to 15 trains per hour. In addition, the frequency of weekday evening service was increased, with trains running every ten minutes instead of every 12 minutes.

On September 8, 2002, Stillwell Avenue was closed for reconstruction. F service was cut back to Avenue X, and service to Stillwell Avenue was replaced by a shuttle bus. F service returned to Stillwell Avenue on May 23, 2004, upon completion of the construction work.

Automation

In the 2010s, the MTA implemented communications-based train control (CBTC) on the portion of the IND Queens Boulevard Line west of Kew Gardens–Union Turnpike. The 63rd Street Connection to 21st Street–Queensbridge, used by the F. would also be retrofitted with CBTC. The automation of the Queens Boulevard Line meant that the  would be able to run 3 more trains during peak hours, up from 29 trains per hour before the project started. CBTC on the Queens Boulevard Line west of Union Turnpike was fully operational by February 2022. The 2015–2019 Capital Program was revised in April 2018 to fund to the design for the expedited installation of CBTC on the Queens Boulevard Line east of Kew Gardens–Union Turnpike. 

Another part of the F route, between Church Avenue and West Eighth Street–New York Aquarium on the Culver Line, was selected for CBTC installation as part of the 2015–2019 Capital Program. During much of 2020 and 2021, there was no weekend F service south of Church Avenue to accommodate installation of CBTC on the IND Culver Line. In December 2022, the MTA announced that it would award a contract for the installation of CBTC on the Culver Line between Bergen Street and Church Avenue, which carries the F and G routes. As a result of these projects, the F would be automated along all of its route but the segment south of West 8th Street.

As a result of long-term CBTC installation on the Queens Boulevard Line between Union Turnpike and 179th Street, F trains began operating local in Queens during late evenings and late nights on March 17, 2023, marking the return of overnight F local service in Queens since it was discontinued in 2001.

Restoration of express service
There has been community support for resuming express service on the Culver Line between Jay Street–MetroTech and Church Avenue, including from Mayor Michael Bloomberg and Senator Daniel Squadron. The MTA announced that after the elevated Culver Viaduct underwent extensive renovations from 2009 to 2012, "There will be no impediment to implementing the F express."

While F express service was contested for four years by some residents on the Culver Line who feared they would lose a one-seat ride into Manhattan, some politicians drafted a letter in 2014 petitioning for express service. In late October 2015, city officials considered implementing express service. Some rush-hour peak-direction F trains ran express between Jay Street and Fourth Avenue since at least 2015 and the MTA once planned to use expanded rush-hour express service (Jay Street to Church Avenue) in both directions in the summers of 2016 and 2017. In May 2016, the MTA announced half of all rush-hour F trains could start running express in fall 2017, with the train frequency on the rest of the F route remaining the same; this was never implemented. However, this service still remained "under consideration" as of 2017.

In July 2019, the MTA announced that it planned to run four express F trains per day, two in each direction. The express service started on September 16, 2019. The trains run in the peak direction, toward Manhattan in the morning and toward Brooklyn in the evening. The trains make an intermediate stop at Seventh Avenue and bypass a total of six stations. The trains toward Manhattan run between 7 and 7:30 a.m., while the trains toward Coney Island run between 4:25 and 5 p.m. The service frequencies along the line are not changed, as the two express trips in each direction were converted from trips that ran local. This service is represented with a diamond <F> similar to the symbol used on other peak-direction express services. The express service was suspended in March 2020 due to the COVID-19 pandemic, but was restored more than a year later, on May 3, 2021.

Route

Service pattern
The F uses the following lines:

Stations 

For a more detailed station listing, see the articles on the lines listed above.

References

External links 

 MTA NYC Transit – F Sixth Avenue Local
 
 
 

New York City Subway services